The Macedonian lyra (Greek: Μακεδονική λύρα) is a Greek pear-shaped, three-stringed bowed musical instrument, used mainly in the Greek folk music of the Greek region of Macedonia, and especially in the region of Drama, usually accompanied by violin.

References

Sources
kepem.org
kepaam.gr

Greek musical instruments
Bowed instruments